Amateur Golf Championship may refer to:
United States Amateur Championship (golf)
United States Women's Amateur Golf Championship
The Amateur Championship
British Ladies Amateur Golf Championship